José Marcelo Contreras y Muñoz (16 January 1827 – 1890/92) was a Spanish painter and art professor. Largely remembered as a painter of historical scenes, he also created portraits and genre works.

Biography
He was born in Granada. His father, José Contreras Osorio (1794–1874), was an architect. Following his graduation in 1847, he transferred to the Real Academia de Bellas Artes de San Fernando in Madrid, where he studied with Federico de Madrazo and  Juan Antonio Ribera.

In 1854, he moved to Córdoba, where he had been appointed Director of the provincial museum. He spent two years preparing a catalog of the museum's collection, then briefly returned to Granada to marry Francisca Vilches. Back in Córdoba, he began accepting commissions from the local nobility. In 1860, he applied for several open teaching positions.

After 1861, he devoted himself primarily to teaching, initially at the Escuela de Bellas Artes in Cádiz, then at a similar institution in Valencia. During this time, he also held his first successful showings. In 1864, he participated in the National Exhibition of Fine Arts, presenting The Doubt of Saint Peter, with which he won a second-class medal. It was later purchased by the Museo del Prado and, once again, he had clients among the nobility. 

The following year, grieving the death of his wife, he and his children relocated to Madrid, where he was named a Professor at the Academia. He was named a Commander in the Order of Isabel the Catholic.

Contreras died in Grenada ca. 1890–1892.

References

External links 

More works by Contreras @ ArtNet

1827 births
1890s deaths
Year of death uncertain
Spanish painters
History painters
Spanish genre painters
Decorative arts
Real Academia de Bellas Artes de San Fernando alumni
People from Granada